Nymphes georgei is an extinct species of lacewing which existed in Washington during the Eocene period.

References

†
Eocene insects of North America
Fossil taxa described in 2009
Prehistoric insects of North America